Feng Zhengjie (born 1968 in Sichuan Province, China) is an artist based in Beijing and Jeju Island of South Korea. Originally a high-school and college art teacher in Sichuan, he came to Beijing in 1995.

His best-known work is his Portrait of China series, very large Warhol-style oil portraits, in a red-and-turquoise palette, of Chinese fashion model faces with vacant diverging eyes (his signature style). Critics view his work as a critique of contemporary consumer society. His early paintings were inspired by 1930s Shanghai posters. His more recent work is based on the red and green of traditional Chinese New Year art, the colors made "more acid, a representation of the flashy, commercial nature of modern China".

Zhengjie has exhibited internationally in many shows including Dialogue With Asia at the Du Store Verden! -initiated Vika Gallery in Oslo, the 2002 Korea Contemporary Art Festival in Seoul, China Femmes de Chine at Veronique Maxe Gallery in Paris, Primary Colors at the Singapore Art Museum in Singapore and New Perspectives in Chinese Painting at Marella Gallery in Milan.

Style
Feng Zhengjie’s “exotically colorful style” is originated from a traditional drawing called “Mian Zhu Nian Hua,” which is created and used in a village in Si Chuan called “Mian Zhu.” Mian Zhu Nian Hua’s first appearance can be traced back to Song Dynasty and it becomes very popular during Ming Dynasty and reaches its prime during Qing Dynasty. It reflects people’s optimistic attitude toward life and work. In an interview, Feng said that he grew up in a very small village in Si Chuan province and the colorful traditional drawings reminded him of the memory of his childhood, which was also the main reason for him to start his unique drawing style. In his paintings, Feng loves to use very flashy colors such as pure bright red, bright pink and flashy green to draw the background and characters. Most characters in his drawings are females with sexy lips and vacant diverging eyes.

Although Feng has been quite successful in the international art market these years, his brave usage of bright colors has drawn criticism. In Chinese culture, red, green, and pink colors are usually associated with the superficial and shallow; people also accuse Feng because they think he paints to meet the western taste as well as to make money. Despite all the negative opinions, Feng claims that he never considers making any changes and he will carry on this style to the end. According to him, any art piece that is designed to make an impression cannot be achieved with the idea of contrast.  
Feng denies that his drawings are satires or protests; instead, he says that his drawings are simply objective expression of the influence of consuming cultures on people. He has stated, "Today’s society is developing so rapidly in every aspects and following the development are more temptations. These temptations will make people unable to focus and confused. The dynamic motion of the ladies’ eyes portrays the fact that females can only catch up with what’s going on around them by moving their eyes constantly."

Opinion
Feng Zhengjie has been firmly carrying on his style even facing the huge economic crisis during 2008. When he is asked if he will regard the economic crisis as an opportunity to change his painting style, Feng says that he will not change his style to meet any change of other people’s taste. His has been painting for more than two decades and people can tell his style also changes from time to time; however, none of those changes is related to market considerations. He finds his confidence from working hard constantly, and more importantly he enjoys every single change he makes in his paintings. “A little change on the contour of a character’s nose will get me excited, but in the audience’s eyes this little change makes almost no difference at all. They simply cannot comprehend the joyfulness I have experienced during the painting. One can argue that artists are ‘selfish’ to certain extent. It is just like you watch a worker digging a hole on the ground. In your eyes the worker is doing the exactly same thing over and over again, but actually the worker digs to different depth every single time,” Feng explains.

Solo exhibitions

2007 
Paintings of Feng Zhengjie, Tilton Gallery, New York
2006 
Paintings of Feng Zhengjie, Tokyo Gallery, Tokyo, Japan 
Very Red and Very Green, Xin Dong Cheng Space for Contemporary    Art, Beijing, China 
A Beautiful Deception, Shine Art Space, Shanghai, China
2005
Paintings of Feng Zhengjie, Marella Gallery, Milan, Italy 
Paintings of Feng Zhengjie, Goethe Art Center, Taichung, Taiwan 
Paintings of Feng Zhengjie, Galerie De Bellecour, Lyon, France
2004 
Kitsch As A Face of Chinese Society, Vanessa Art House, Jakarta, Indonesia; Soobin Art Gallery, Singapore 
Kitsch As A Face Of Chinese Society, Soobin Art Gallery, Singapore 
The Beautiful Poison, Suka Art Space, Korea
2003 
Regards vers l'Est, Regards vers l"oust, Albert Benamou Gallery, Paris, France
2002 
Paintings of Feng Zhengjie, M.K. Ciurlionis National Museum of Art, Kaunas, Lithuania Packaging, Xin Dong CHENG's Space for 2002         **International Contemporary Art, Beijing, China
2001 
Coolness, Common Ground Art Gallery, Windsor, Canada
1996 
Recounting of Skin, Art Museum of Capital Normal University, Beijing, China

Appearances 
Feng worked with Singaporean actor, Qi Yuwu, for the first time, for the inaugural Worlds Apart Fair in 2013.

References

External links
Feng Zhengjie at 88MoCCA: The Museum of Chinese contemporary art on the web
Controversy between Chinese artists, collectors, curators and auction house

Living people
1968 births
Painters from Sichuan